Chimaericola leptogaster is a species of polyopisthocotylean monogenean in the family Chimaericolidae. It is ectoparasitic on the gills of the chimaera Chimaera monstrosa.

History

According to Brinkmann, the species was discovered as early as 1828 on the gills of chimaeras off Norway by Rapp and was given a scientific name by Friedrich Sigismund Leuckart in 1830, as Octobothrium leptogaster, but Leuckart did not see the animal. The species was then mentioned by Félix Dujardin and Karl Moriz Diesing, who also did not see the specimens. However, Diesing transferred the species to the genus Discocotyle but also considered the species as "species inquirenda". Later, in 1858, Diesing transferred the species to the genus Placoplectanum. Olsson redescribed the animal in 1876  and used again the name Octobothrium leptogaster. The species was shortly redescribed by Parona & Perugia in 1892.

Finally Brinkmann redescribed the species in details in 1942  from material collected off Norway and Sweden.

Morphology
Chimaericola leptogaster is a large monogenean, reaching 50 mm in length. The haptor, at the posterior end of the body, bears eight clamps arranged as two rows of four.

Modern works

The first molecular sequences obtained from Chimaericola leptogaster suggested that the Chimaericolidae were a basal group within the Polyopisthocotylea.

Chimaericola leptogaster was studied with transmission electron microscopy. Several organs have been investigated in details: vaginae, clamps, digestive system, and spermiogenesis and spermatozoa. These ultrastructural results have confirmed the basal position of the species in comparison to marine Polyopisthocotylea.

References

Polyopisthocotylea
Fauna of Norway
Fauna of Sweden
Animals described in 1830